Pursuit of Honor  is the debut studio album by American extreme metal band Battlecross.  The album was released on August 2, 2011 via Metal Blade Records.

Production 
In 2010, Battlecross self-released their debut album Push Pull Destroy.  In late 2010, the band caught the eye of Metal Blade Records while members were replacing their vocalist, Marshall Wood.  The band tapped Kyle "Gumby" Gunther of the Flint, MI-area band and management roster mate, I Decay, to front the band.  Gunther stepped in to re-record the album and rewrote the track Aiden, renaming it Kaleb after his newborn son.  The re-recorded album, Pursuit of Honor, was released in August 2011 by Metal Blade Records  and was recorded at Random Awesome Recording Studio in Bay City, Michigan and produced by Josh Schroeder.

Critical reception 
Pursuit of Honor produced three singles. "Push Pull Destroy", "Man of Stone" and "Breaking You", which combined, spent 50 weeks on SiriusXM Liquid Metal 'Devil's Dozen' list of most requested songs, with ‘Push Pull Destroy’ at the #1 spot for five weeks in Spring 2012. The accompanying video has racked up more than 1.8 million views on YouTube, and was the break-out track for the band.

Pursuit of Honor received accolades from music reviewers from across the globe.  In many reviews, the album referenced the band's promise to rival the Big Four of Metal and perhaps one of the best albums on the modern thrash metal scene.  The band and the debut also drew comparisons to metal groove heavy-weights Pantera and Lamb of God, with Metal Assault naming the record "one of the most 'complete' heavy metal albums in recent times" and "bristling with fist-pumping, face-melting heavy metal at its finest."

Oft-critical website Blabbermouth reviewed the album as "easily one of the better metal debuts of 2011," stating that Pursuit of Honor will leave you breathless, maybe even skinless" and giving the album an '8' rating.  The website described the album as  "traditional thrash metal, but not in a retro wannabe sense, and is delivered in a package that is modern, yet avoids being too cookie-cutter; melodic, yet not "pretty" or cleanly sung. Death metal heaviness with compositional skill, "Pursuit of Honor" is above all else inanely energized."

Track listing

References

External links 

2011 debut albums
Battlecross albums
Metal Blade Records albums